The Amur Military Flotilla (AMF) was a military flotilla on the Amur river in the Far East region of Russia.

History
In 1900, the Russians formed a temporary flotilla on the Amur from private steamers and barges. Initially, it served transportation purposes during the Russo-Japanese War of 1904–1905. Officially, the AMF was created in July 1906 for the purpose of defending the border line of the Amur basin and securing water communication on the Amur. In 1910, the AMF comprised 28 vessels, including eight turret gunboats and ten smaller gunboats. In December 1917, it formed the Soviet Amur military flotilla, which took part in the Russian Civil War.

In 1918, the AMF was captured by Japanese forces, who took away almost all of the ships in May 1920. With the end of the Civil War in the Far East, the Soviets began reconstruction of the flotilla. In 1925–1926, it grew bigger with the return of the ships which had been taken away by the Japanese. In 1929, the AMF included four river monitors and other ships. In 1930, the AMF was awarded with the Order of the Red Banner for its successful military operations during the Sino-Soviet conflict of 1929.

Neon Antonov (1907–1948) was transferred to command the flotilla in preparation for the war against Japan. During the operation, the AMF (eight monitors, eleven gunboats, 52 armored launches etc.) under the command of Antonov cooperated with the armies of the 1st and the 2nd Far Eastern fronts on the Amur, Ussuri, and Sungari rivers and Lake Khanka.

The Amur Military Flotilla was disbanded on 7 June 1998.

See also
 Evacuation of Manchukuo
 Kanchazu Island incident

Notes

References 

Naval units and formations of the Soviet Union
Naval units and formations of Russia
Military history of Manchuria